High Bridge carries the High Street across the River Witham in Lincoln in eastern England. It is the oldest bridge in the United Kingdom which still has buildings on it. The bridge was built about 1160 AD and a bridge chapel was built dedicated to Thomas Becket in 1235 on the east side of the bridge. The chapel was removed in 1762.  The current row of timber framed shops on the west side of the bridge date  from  about 1550. The two upper storeys of the shops are jettied forward  and at the corners there are carved figures of angels. The shops were partly dismantled and re-erected in 1901–02 under the supervision of the Lincoln architect  William Watkins.

Bridges like this were common in the Middle Ages, the best known being London Bridge, but most have long since been demolished because of their obstruction to the river flow and to shipping.

The Glory Hole is the name given by generations of boaters to the High Bridge in Lincoln. It has a narrow and crooked arch which sets a limit on the size of boats using the Witham and going from Brayford Pool, at the start of Foss Dyke, to Boston and the sea.

Since the 14th century the bridge has contributed to floods in Lincoln and after any heavy rain the bridge is virtually unnavigable, which may be why it got its name. A design by William Jessop in the 19th century to reroute the waters of the Witham through the south of the town was never implemented.

The bridge is both a grade I listed building and a scheduled monument.

See also
 Alte Nahebrücke
 Krämerbrücke
 Pont des Marchands
 Pulteney Bridge

References

Bridges in Lincolnshire
Grade I listed bridges
Buildings and structures completed in 1160
Buildings and structures in Lincoln, England
Bridges with buildings
Scheduled monuments in Lincolnshire
Timber framed buildings in England
Bridges completed in the 12th century
Arch bridges in the United Kingdom